Nenax is a genus of flowering plants in the family Rubiaceae. It was described by Joseph Gaertner in 1788. The genus is found in Namibia, South Africa and Lesotho.

References

External links 
 Nenax in the World Checklist of Rubiaceae

Rubiaceae genera
Anthospermeae